Robati may refer to:
Pupuke Robati (1925-2009), Prime Minister of the Cook Islands
Robati, Iran, a village in Razavi Khorasan Province
Robati Gharbatha, a village in Razavi Khorasan Province
Robati Shahzadeh, a village in Razavi Khorasan Province